Mark E. Recktenwald (born October 8, 1955) is the chief justice of the Supreme Court of Hawaii.

Background and career
Recktenwald graduated from Deerfield Academy in Deerfield, Massachusetts, and then Harvard University in 1978.
He wrote a thesis for his degree in anthropology titled "State and economy in Moche III-IV society".
He came to Hawaii in 1980 where he met his wife Gailynn. They had a son Andrew born c. 1989 and daughter Sarah born c. 1992. He worked as a reporter in the United Press International’s Honolulu Bureau.
He graduated from the University of Chicago Law School in 1986.
He published a paper on employment discrimination cases.

After law school, Recktenwald became a clerk for judge Harold Michael Fong of the United States District Court for the District of Hawaii until 1987. He then became an associate with Goodsill Anderson Quinn and Stifel in 1988.
In 1991 he became assistant United States Attorney, litigating both civil and criminal cases.  He served as the health care fraud coordinator and environmental law enforcement coordinator for the U.S. Attorney’s Office, and was a prosecutor in other types of cases. 
In 1997 he became partner with the law firm of Marr Hipp Jones and Pepper specializing in employment litigation.
In 1999 he returned to the U.S. Attorney’s Office.
He became director of the Hawaii state Department of Commerce and Consumer Affairs (DCCA) in 2003.

Judicial service
In May 2007 he was appointed chief judge of the Hawaii Intermediate Court of Appeals.  He participated in more than 250 cases and authored 10 published opinions.
In February 2009 (confirmed in May 2009) he replaced retired Associate Justice Steven H. Levinson on the Supreme Court of Hawaii.
On August 13, 2010, Recktenwald was nominated for chief justice by Governor Linda Lingle. He was retained for a second term as Chief Justice and sworn in by Justice Paula A. Nakayama on September 11, 2020.

References

|-

1955 births
Living people
21st-century American judges
Assistant United States Attorneys
Chief Justices of the Hawaii Supreme Court
Deerfield Academy alumni
Harvard University alumni
Hawaii lawyers
Lawyers from Detroit
University of Chicago Law School alumni